Pêr-Jakez Helias, baptised Pierre-Jacques Hélias, nom de plume Pierre-Jakez Hélias (1914–1995) was a Breton stage actor, journalist, author, poet, and writer for radio who worked in the French and Breton languages. For many years he directed a weekly radio programme in the Breton language and co-founded a summer festival at Quimper which became the Festival de Cornouaille.

Life and work

Helias was born in 1914 in Pouldreuzig, Penn-ar-Bed, Brittany. His father, Pierre-Alain Hélias, was a native of the nearby village of Plozévet. Helias' mother, Marie-Jeanne Le Goff, had grown up in Pouldreuzic, to which her husband moved after their wedding in 1913. Hélias' paternal grandfather, Yann Helias, was a tenant farmer, sabot-maker, and storyteller known in Plozévet as Yann ar Burzudou ("Yann the Wonder-Man").

Pierre-Alain Hélias had previously served at Vannes in an artillery unit of the French Army and, upon the outbreak of World War I in August 1914, he was recalled to active service. Pierre-Jacques Hélias later recalled that, during his father's combat duty as a Poilu on the Western Front, he and his mother were given, "twenty sous a day... to keep ourselves alive". His father's sickle was wielded during harvest-time by his mother and was sharpened upon a stone moistened with her tears. Hélias further recalled, "When my father returned home from the battlefield, he let his wife keep the sickle. For he thought he was no longer it's master, that mother had truly earned it... In the end,it's blade wasn't much bigger than that of a pocket knife. I rather think that tears are more effective than stone for wearing down a sickle." One of Hélias' maternal uncles, who had been serving before the war as an officer in French Indochina, was less fortunate, and returned to France only to be killed in action during the First World War.

Hélias had a modest upbringing, but this included a good education. During the interwar period, the village was divided between "Reds", who discretely supported the anti-clericalism of the Third French Republic, and "Whites", who supported the Catholic Church in France. Despite the religious devotion of his mother, Pierre-Alain and Marie-Jeanne Hélias were "Reds" and, against the opposition of their parish priest, they chose to enroll their son in a secular and state-run school, in the hopes that he would learn French and move up in the world.

After a career in the French Resistance during the Second World War, in 1946 Helias was appointed as director of a weekly programme in Breton on Radio Kimerc'h. Working with Pierre Trépos, he created hundreds of dialogues, many of them between two stock characters, Gwilhou Vihan and Jakez Kroc'hen. In 1948 he was the co-founder, with François Bégot and Jo Halleguen, of Les grandes Fêtes de Cornouaille, an Eisteddfod-inspired summer festival celebrating Breton culture.

The theatre was Helias's favourite genre, as he was convinced that Breton culture was primarily a spoken one, so that it could best be captured by drama, and much of his early work was in the form of plays and scripts for radio. His An Isild a-heul, or Yseulte seconde (1963), was a three-act tragedy based on the story of Tristan and Isolde, but with a focus on Tristan's wife rather than his lover. Written first in Breton, it was published in a dual text, with a French translation on the facing page, and was broadcast on the France Culture radio station in 1965.

Helias's best-known and most often performed play is Mevel ar Gosker, or 'The Yardman of Kosker'. A mevel bras (majordomo) was the most important farm worker, a man who might enjoy many privileges, but who was not of the landowning class and it was inconceivable in traditional Breton culture that he could aspire to marry into it. However, the mevel of the play, Jakez Mano, contrives by a complicated means to wed his boss's daughter, God Konan. The fact that he can actually achieve this is seen as proof that the old Brittany, in which marriages were always within the same social class, is changing.

Helias's poetry includes two collections in Breton, Ar men du (1974, The Black Stone) and An tremen-buhez (1979, The Pastime). An important theme in his work was his devotion to the Breton language and its power. One of his lines translates as "Breton speaker that I am, my heritage lies on my tongue, it shall never be yours".

His best-selling work is his memoir Le cheval d'orgueil, or The Horse of Pride, rooted in the Bigoudenn area south of Quimper.

Helias also collected Breton folk tales and published work on the Breton language and culture. He became a major figure in Breton literature during the last third of the 20th century.

For example, the Encyclopædia Britannica of 1997 says of him, "Per-Jakez Helias as poet, playwright, and radio script writer has been both prolific and popular."

Despite his importance to Breton literature, Helias came under fire from far left radicals promoting language revival, Breton nationalism, and Anti-French sentiment. This was only partly due to Helias' willingness to write in French and his refusal to denounce that language. In Le cheval d'orgueil, Helias was attacked for admitting that his parents chose to enroll him in the village school out of a desire for him to succeed and that, as a child, he enjoyed attending a school which tolerated only French. 

Furthermore, Hélias did not solely blame the French Government or the coercive Francization of the state schools for the recent collapse of the Breton language and culture. He also had very harsh words for the actions of Breton bishops and clergy during the aftermath of the Second Vatican Council. The removal of often centuries old works of Christian art and the replacement of the Tridentine Mass in Ecclesiastical Latin with the Mass of Paul VI in French was, in Hélias' opinion, far more to blame for the recent secularization of the region.

He wrote, "There were Reds in the Church, people said. Soon everyone was to go to Mass as they went to school. In other words, some were to be good pupils and others bad pupils. Not so very long ago, everyone understood everything in the same way; each one of them truly partook of the sacraments; and they all knew several hymns by heart, hymns that rang out through the church. Now, the singing rings hollow; indeed, the elderly don't even dare participate. Mass is no longer a joy; it's not even restful. Lukewarm soup without any flavor."

Even though Hélias ended his memoir by expressing hope for a Breton, Basque, and Provençal language revival, radical nationalists, like Xavier Grall, condemned his memoir as folklore. 

Furthermore, John Ardagh commented in 1982, "Brittany's two writers most famous in France as a whole, Per-Jakez Helias and Jean-Edern Hallier, are regarded with some scorn by the Breton zealots."

Helias died on 13 August 1995 in Quimper, Brittany.

In popular culture
 Hélias's memoir was adapted into a film of the same name by director Claude Chabrol in 1980.

Selected publications

Biskoaz kemend-all (1947)
Eun ano bras, darvoud en eun arvest (1953)
War eun dachenn foball (1955)
Danses de Bretagne (1955)
Mojennou Breiz I (1957)
Tan ha ludu (1957)
Eun den maro ha ne goll ket e benn (1958)
Mojennou Breiz II (1959)
Mevel ar Gosker (play, 1959)
Kanadenn Penn ar Bed (1959)Marvaillou ar votez-tan. Contes  du sabot à feu (1961)Comme on connaît ses saints (1961)An Izild a-heul; Yseult seconde (play, 1963)Maner Kuz. Manoir secret (1964)Divizou eun amzer gollet. Devis d'un temps perdu (1966)Contes  du pays bigouden (1967)Bretagne aux légendes : la mer (1967)Costumes de Bretagne (1969)Contes  de la Chantepleure (1971)Tradition bretonne : le savoir-vivre (1973)Légendes du Raz de Sein (1972)Ar men du; la pierre noire (poetry, 1974)Le cheval d'orgueuil, Mémoires d'un Breton du pays bigouden (autobiography, 1975)Tradition bretonne : logis et ménages (1975)Comment un Breton devint roi d'Angleterre (1976)Les autres et les miens: le trésor du Cheval d'orgueil (1977)Peziou-c'hoari Jakez Krohen (1977)Penaoz e teuas eur Breizad da veza roue Bro-Zaoz (1977)Le Grand valet, La Femme de paille, Le Tracteur - Théâtre I (1977)Lettres de Bretagne: langues, culture et civilisations bretonnes (1978)An tremen-buhez; le passe-vie (poetry, 1979)La sagesse de la terre (1980)Quimper en Cornouaille (1980)Au pays du Cheval d'orgueil (1980)Piou e-neus lazet an hini koz? (1981)L'esprit du rivage (1981)L'herbe d'or (novel, 1982)Images de Bretagne (1983)La colline des solitudes (novel, 1984)Les contes du vrai et du semblant (1984)
 (Breton autobiography, 1986)Dictionnaire . Breton-français, français- (1986)Bugale Berlobi I - Brud an Dreued (1987)Lisbonne (1987)Bugale Berlobi II - Marvaillou da veva en ho sav (1988)Vent de soleil (1988)Midi à ma porte (1988)Amsked. Pobl an noz; Clair-obscur. Le peuple de la nuit (1990)Le quêteur de mémoire: quarante ans de recherche sur les mythes et la civilisation bretonne (1990)La nuit singulière (1990)D'un autre monde; A-berz eur bed all (poetry, 1991)
Katrina Lenn-zu (1993)
Le diable à quatre (novel, 1993)
Le piéton de Quimper (1993)
Ruz-Kov ar foeterez-vro: gand seiteg tresadenn war pri-poaz gand Dodik (1996)
Ventre-à-Terre, l'aventurier
Un pays à deux langues (2000)

Notes

Further reading
 Pierre-Jakez Hélias, book #36, published by Skol Vreizh
 Per-Jakez Hélias. Niverenn ispisial, special edition #172, published by Brud Nevez, 1994
 Francis Favereau: Pierre-Jakez Hélias, Bigouden universel, published by Pluriel
 Thierry Glon: Pierre-Jakez Hélias et la Bretagne perdue, published by Presses Universitaires de Rennes, 1998
 Pascal Rannou: Inventaire d'un héritage — Essai sur l'œuvre littéraire de Pierre-Jakez Hélias, published by An Here, 1997; new édition by Les Montagnes noires, 2014.

1914 births
1995 deaths
Poets from Brittany
Writers from Brittany
People from Finistère
French Catholic poets
University of Rennes alumni
20th-century French poets
Breton-language poets
French male poets
20th-century French male writers
French journalists
French Resistance members